is a 1997–1998 anime television series in the Cutie Honey franchise.  Airing in Japan, the series assumed the timeslot of Sailor Stars, the final story arc of the long-running Sailor Moon anime. Employing many of the same animation staff of Sailor Stars, including animation director Miho Shimogasa, Flash features very similar character designs and fits the more traditional mold of magical girl series, aimed at the Sailor Moon demographic.

Plot
Honey Kisaragi is a 16-year-old perfectly normal, beautiful high school student... until her scientist father is kidnapped by the evil organization Panther Claw, that is. However, her father left behind a device that she can use to transform into the pink-haired sword-wielding heroine, Cutie Honey.  Aided by Seiji Hayami, a private eye who specializes in Panther Claw, and the mysterious "Twilight Prince", she fights members of Panther Claw in order to rescue her father.

Characters
Like New Cutie Honey before it, Cutie Honey Flash makes references to other series from Cutie Honey creator Go Nagai.  Recurring Honey characters Honey Kisaragi, Seiji, Danbei, Natsuko, Panther Zora, Sister Jill, and Miharu made a return, along with Alphonne, Principal Pochi (as a poodle).

Main characters
The protagonist of the series, as with other Cutie Honey media, is Honey Kisaragi.  However, unlike other Cutie Honey incarnations, Honey is not an android but possesses a fully functional human body including reproductive capabilities. Consequently, she is indeed a 16-year-old girl at the beginning of the series, not a robot posing as one. Honey studies at the boarding school, St. Chapel Academy, along with best friend Natsuko Aki (who is nicknamed "Nat-chan") from the original 1970s version of Honey.  The academy's faculty includes former Honey characters as well: here, Miharu returns as a dreaded teacher, while Danbei Hayami is the academy's director.  Later in the series, Alphonne, also from the original Cutie Honey, appears as Danbei's older sister.

Honey receives help, advice, and white flowers from a mysterious .  Among the things the prince gives Honey are objects invented by her father, the scientist Takeshi Kisaragi. Honey can use the Atmospheric Element Condenser in her body, by pressing her choker and saying the phrase "Honey Flash", to transform in various ways and can heal from otherwise grievous wounds in a matter of hours.  Much like the original version, she possesses the Honey Boomerang and Silver Fleuret as her weapons. Honey can transform into a variety of personas in this series; she can change into versions of Hurricane Honey and Cutie Honey from the 1970s versions, as well as these:

Hurricane Honey (biker). A woman who rides her motorcycle like the wind.
Scoop Honey (paparazzi). A woman who is ready with her film and camera acting as a reporter.
Stage Honey (singer). A woman who has her microphone and her formal dress ready for an audience.
Nurse Honey (nurse). A woman who knows medical needs.
Elegance Honey (bride). A woman who wears a white wedding dress. She uses a bouquet when she's in danger.
Escort Honey (tour guide). A woman disguised as a flight attendant.
Hyper Honey (heroine). The hearts of Honey and Seira combine to take this form, resembling Cutie Honey but with a different outfit and far more powerful.

Later in the series it is revealed that Honey and Seira were two survivors of a series of artificially created humans that were created to possess the Atmospheric Element Condenser created by her father and Twilight Prince under Panther Claw before Sister Jill personally terminated the project. After the destruction of the incubation machine, Dr. Kisaragi found and raised Honey as his own while Seira was taken in by Twilight Prince and Panther Zora.

According to episode 11, her birth date is February 2, 1981. Her blood type is AB.

Panther Claw
In Cutie Honey Flash, Honey must deal with a version of the Panther Claw organization, composed of Panther Zora, a stone figure that reigns over the group; Sister Jill, who is Zora's second-in-command; Prince Zera, a Panther Claw leader who jealously seeks Sister Jill's position in the group; and various henchmen.  When fighting enemies, Cutie Honey uses attacks such as the Honey Boomerang, Honey Lightning Flare, Honey Rouge Arrow, and  Honey Virginal Invitation.

A fourth character from the original Honey series, Seiji Hayami, appears as a detective whose father was killed by the Panther Claw.  Seiji often meets Honey in her Cutie Honey form, not knowing that she is Kisaragi.

Misty Honey

The fourteenth episode of the anime introduces Misty Honey, as an original character and a major antagonist, a rival and self-proclaimed twin sister of Cutie Honey, whose name was chosen through a contest in Japan. Misty Honey, unlike Cutie Honey, cannot turn into anyone she wants; she can only change to Misty Honey. She has a band around her thigh that resembles Honey's choker which acts as the activator for her Atmospheric Element Condenser but she uses a ring to transform with the words "Honey Flash".  Seira's heart was "poisoned" by Panther Zora when she was found by Twilight Prince. The darkness in her heart (and her flawed transformation device) creates Panther Claw minions. Later in the series, it is revealed that Honey and Seira were two survivors of a series of artificially created humans that were created to possess the Atmospheric Element Condenser created by her father and Twilight Prince under Panther Claw before Dr. Kisaragi personally terminated the project. After the destruction of the incubation machine, Dr. Kisaragi found and raised Honey as his own while Seira was taken in by Twilight Prince and Panther Zora. Her alter ego, Seira Hazuki, shares her given name with Seiji and Honey's child, who appears only in the 39th and final episode.

She can be seen as a negative version of Cutie, since Misty Honey has long blue hair and a more revealing outfit, while Cutie has short pink hair and a less revealing outfit.   While the anime and manga versions of the characters of Cutie Honey Flash mostly look similar, the two versions of Hazuki differ greatly in appearance.  Misty Honey's attacks include Honey Sexy Dynamite. Seira's family name "Hazuki" is the classical/romantic Japanese name for  the eighth month of the lunar calendar. In contrast, Honey's family name "Kisaragi" is the classical/romantic Japanese name for the second month of the lunar calendar. "Kisaragi" corresponds to March/April (Spring), while "Hazuki" corresponds to September/October (Autumn) of the solar calendar, representing the opposing characteristics of the twin sisters.

Production
Cutie Honey Flash uses hand-drawn cel animation; according to Shimogasa, the use of computer animated characters on hand-painted backgrounds was planned and tested, but later rejected.  Its theme music was performed by Salia.

Media

Episodes

Part 1

Part 2

Part 3

References

External links

Cutie Honey F -'97 Summer Toei Animation Fair (キューティーハニーＦ  － '97夏東映アニメフェア) 

Flash
1997 anime television series debuts
TV Asahi original programming
1997 manga
Shōjo manga
Magical girl anime and manga